P. Scott Neville Jr. is a justice of the Illinois Supreme Court.

Education

Neville received his undergraduate degree from Culver–Stockton College and his Juris Doctor from Washington University School of Law.

Legal career

He was admitted to the bar in 1974 and served as a law clerk to Appellate Court Justice Glenn T. Johnson. From 1977 until 1979, he was Of Counsel at Howard, Mann & Slaughter. In 1979, he became a principal with the law firm of Neville & Ward. In 1981, he established P. Scott Neville, Jr. & Associates, which merged with Howse, Howse, Neville & Gray in 1990.

State judicial service

He was appointed to the Circuit Court of Cook County in 1999 and elected in 2000. On June 11, 2004, he was appointed to the Appellate Court to succeed Neil Hartigan. He was then elected to the Appellate Court in 2012. He also served as Chairman of the Executive Committee for the Illinois Appellate Court, First District from September 1, 2013 until August 31, 2014, is a former member of the Appellate Court's Executive Committee and has been the Presiding Justice of the Second, Third and Fourth Divisions.

Appointment to Illinois Supreme Court

Neville was appointed by the Supreme Court to fill the vacancy created by the retirement of Charles E. Freeman. He was sworn into office on June 15, 2018 and his would have ended on December 7, 2020, but his was subsequently elected in his own right. Neville was only the second black justice in the Illinois Supreme Court's 170-year history (Freeman had been the first).

Personal life

Neville was born in Chicago. He is married to Sharon J. Neville and has two adult stepdaughters.

See also
List of African-American jurists

References

External links
Official Biography on Illinois Supreme Court website

1940s births
Living people
20th-century American lawyers
21st-century American judges
African-American judges
African-American lawyers
Culver–Stockton College alumni
Illinois lawyers
Illinois state court judges
Justices of the Illinois Supreme Court
Lawyers from Chicago
Washington University School of Law alumni
Year of birth missing (living people)
Illinois Democrats